The Bendora Gravity Main is a water main located in the Australian Capital Territory, Australia.

Water in the water main travels  from the Bendora Dam via gravity to the treatment plant on Mount Stromlo, adjacent to the Cotter Dam pumping station, upstream from the confluence of the Cotter River with the Murrumbidgee River. Construction of the water main commenced in 1966 and was opened on 5 January 1968. Prior to the construction of the gravity main, water was stored in Bendora Dam and released down the Cotter River to the Cotter Dam. The water main has  the capacity to carry  of water per day.

The Bendora Gravity Main also supplies the Mount Stromlo Hydro-Power Station.

References

External links

 Photo of its construction

Water management in the Australian Capital Territory
Murray-Darling basin
Transport buildings and structures in the Australian Capital Territory